Takele Uma Banti (Oromo: Takala Umaa Bantii; born 1981) is an Ethiopian politician who had served as the Minister for Mines Petroleum of Ethiopia from 18 August 2020 to 14 January 2023.  He was the 31st Mayor of Addis Ababa who came to prominence for his transformational way of doing business and his visionary leadership roles after Ethiopia's reform by the current leadership of the country starting 2018.

Early life and career
Takele currently serves as a member of the Council of Ministers as the Minister of Mines and Petroleum for the Federal Democratic Republic of Ethiopia. He first got international attention for his previous role as the reformist 31st Mayor of Addis Ababa, Ethiopia. 

In addition to serving as Mayor of Addis Ababa, he has served as Mayor of Sebeta and Holeta and held many leadership roles across Trade, Transportation and Urban Land Development. He was also the City Manager for Sululta Municipal Administrations prior to achieving his for mayoral position. He held multiple different board seats at the top of the country's universities including being the previous Chairman of Addis Ababa University. 

As part of his previous responsibilities in the state of Oromia, he has founded and was a board chairman to Oromia Water Sport Federation, Founder of Free Education for Girls with Disabilities Foundation, and co-founded Hope 2020 Foundation. He has made a major contribution to the establishment of Born Free Foundation.
Banti and his administration has now introduced a block-based community service project which plans to address different security, social, economic and service-based queries of city residents in their own blocks mainly by themselves by participating prominent figures and district officials in the villages which complement the service delivery at both sub-city and district level.

Education
Takele earned a Masters of Environmental Engineering and a Bachelors of Chemical Engineering from Addis Ababa University. As a true advocate for lifelong learning, Takele has continued his education by receiving certifications in both Economic Development and Leading Economic Growth at Harvard University in Boston, Massachusetts. Takele also received a Management Certification in Transportation from Galilee International Management Institute in Israel. As well as recently completed his coursework achieving a Masters of Science in Economics at his alma mater, Addis Ababa University.

Takele has been recognized globally for his quick actions influencing lasting change and effective results to magnify this impact. He fostered partnerships at top universities and institutions as well as being invited to notable events from Heads of State & Ambassadors to large international organizations. In addition, Takele has received multiple awards for his development and partnership work as a leader on the African continent and continues to pursue large innovative projects that can be scaled so that Ethiopia can realize its yet untapped economic potential.

Minister of Mines and Petroleum
Takele served as a member of the Council of Ministers as the Ministry of Mines and Petroleum (MoMP) for Ethiopia from 18 August 2020. Takele brings a full spectrum of both professional capacity building to transform and meet growth targets as well as a precise technological expertise to the Ministry. He has currently initiated the following partnerships and projects. 

Partnerships with international development institutes and governments is a crucial element of Ethiopia’s Home Grown Economic Agenda as it relates to the mining and petroleum sectors.The MoMP has formed partnerships with the following development institutions: 

 The Western Australia School of Mines
 Colorado School of Mines
 United Nations Industrial Development Organisation (UNIDO)
 African Development Bank (AfDB)
 Intergovernmental Forum (IGF) 
 Curtin University and Tulu Kapi Gold Mines Company

On 14 January 2023, the Council of Minister approved that Takele Uma would left the position, alongside the Ministry of Transport and Communications Dagmawit Moges.

Mayor of Addis Ababa
As a reformist leader he has initiated, led and executed several mega projects in the city.
In the short two year term in this role he had already implemented a school uniform, supplies, and lunch feeding program that reaches a total of 600k public school grade students for free.

This was one of the most notable projects ever executed by a Mayor by both the scale and impact to the families of Addis Ababa, He also created the biggest Mass Sports event in Africa, improved water coverage by over 15%, renovated thousands of schools, elderly, homes and hospitals, and commissioned the works of multiple billion dollar development projects during his short term. The most notable development projects were the city-wide flagship green projects introducing new public space and recreational concepts that are also cleaning the local rivers and creating new parks known as the "Shegar" Project. 

This was the beginning of a number or tourist locations that not only beautify the city, but attract investment and visitors from all over the world. He has been known for his passion for renewable energy and trying to build the country’s capacity in alignment with the United Nations Sustainable Development Goals around energy. These mega-projects commissioned in Addis Ababa in addition to the jobs it has already created has created a renewed investment in the next generation, the future leaders, by taking up for example the new art museum named "Adwa" to commemorate Ethiopia's victory at the battle against Italy. This is symbolic of the great history of the previous generations while also ensuring the technology and literature meet the International scale for the education of the current generation.

References

Living people
21st-century Ethiopian politicians
Mayors of Addis Ababa
Addis Ababa University alumni
Place of birth missing (living people)
Ministers of Mines and Petroleum
1981 births